The 1987–88 National Football League, known for sponsorship reasons as the Royal Liver National Football League, was the 57th staging of the National Football League (NFL), an annual Gaelic football tournament for the Gaelic Athletic Association county teams of Ireland.

Meath won the league, beating Dublin in a replayed final.

Format

Divisions
 Division One: 8 teams
 Division Two: 8 teams
 Division Three: 16 teams. Split into two regional groups of 8 (North and South)

Round-robin format
Each team played every other team in its division (or group where the division is split) once, either home or away.

Points awarded
2 points were awarded for a win and 1 for a draw.

Titles
Teams in all three divisions competed for the National Football League title.

Knockout stage qualifiers
 Division One: top 4 teams
 Division Two: top 2 teams
 Division Three (North):  group winners
 Division Three (South):  group winners

Knockout phase structure
In the quarter-finals, the match-ups were as follows:
 Quarter-final 1: First-placed team in Division One v First-placed team in Division Three (South)
 Quarter-final 2: Second-placed team in Division One v First-placed team in Division Three (North)
 Quarter-final 3: Third-placed team in Division One v Second-placed team in Division Two
 Quarter-final 4: Fourth-placed team in Division One v First-placed team in Division Two
The semi-final match-ups are:
 Semi-final 1: Winner Quarter-final 1 v Winner Quarter-final 4
 Semi-final 2: Winner Quarter-final 2 v Winner Quarter-final 3

The final match-up is: Winner Semi-final 1 v Winner Semi-final 2.

Promotion and relegation

 Division One: bottom 2 teams demoted to Division Two
 Division Two: top 2 teams promoted to Division One. Bottom 2 teams demoted to Division Three.
 Division Three (North): group winners promoted to Division Two. 
 Division Three (South):  group winners promoted to Division Two.

Separation of teams on equal points

In the event that teams finish on equal points, then a play-off will be used to determine group placings if necessary, i.e. where to decide relegation places or quarter-finalists.

League Phase Results and Tables

Division One

Division One (A) play-offs

Table

Division Two

Division Three

Division Three (South)

Promotion play-offs

Division Three (North) table

Division Three (South) table

Knockout stage

Quarter-final

Semi-final

Final

References

National Football League
National Football League
National Football League (Ireland) seasons